Jilloo was an Indian Hindi language film actress born in 1905 in Bombay, India as Zuleka Ebrahain. She acted in Mother India and Mughal-e-Azam, the two biggest commercial and critical successes of the 1950s. She also acted in many movies also, but in very small roles. She portrayed the role of the mother-in-law of Radha, the protagonist of Mother India, and the mother of Anarkali, the lead female character of Mughal-e-Azam. She acted in several other films, including Madhosh, where she played Meena Kumari's mother. She also worked in India's first talkie film Alam Ara. When she was a young women, she was credited as Jilloobai, Jillo, Jilloo, Zillu, Zilloo or Zilloobai. As she started doing more mother roles, she was given the name Jilloo Maa as Maa means mother.

Filmography
1960: Mughal-E-Azam – Anarkali's mother 
1957: Mother India – Sundar Chachi
1951: Madhosh – Soni's mother
1951: Sanam – Jogin's mother
1950: Magroor – Manohar's mother
1950: Sabak
1945: Tadbir
1945: Naseeb
1945: Phool
1945: Vikramaditya
1944: Gaali
1931: Alam Ara
1924: Chandragupta Aur Chanakya
1924: Raziya Begum
1924: Shah Jehan
1924: Veer Durgadas
1947: "Jugnu"- Dilip Kumar's mother
1939:"pukar"

References

External links
 
  (Jilloo Maa)
 Rare Pictures of Jillo Bai

Indian film actresses
Actresses in Hindi cinema
Actresses from Mumbai
1905 births
Year of death missing